Oenomaus taua is a species of butterfly of the family Lycaenidae. It is found in wet lowland forests in Guatemala, Panama, French Guiana, eastern Ecuador, Peru and Brazil.

References

Butterflies described in 2008
Eumaeini
Lycaenidae of South America